Ayoub Abdi (born 16 February 1997) is an Algerian handball player for Fenix Toulouse Handball and the Algerian national team.

He competed at the 2021 World Men's Handball Championship.

References

External links

1997 births
Living people
Algerian male handball players
People from Chlef
21st-century Algerian people
Mediterranean Games competitors for Algeria
Competitors at the 2018 Mediterranean Games
Competitors at the 2022 Mediterranean Games